The Škoda Rapid is a subcompact sedan produced by Škoda India, the subsidiary of the Czech manufacturer Škoda Auto, exclusively for the Indian market, introduced in November 2011. It features a similar front end design with the second generation of the Škoda Fabia, but is not directly related to it, the Rapid being based on the newer PQ25 platform of the Volkswagen Group.

The "Rapid" name was previously used in the 1930s for the Rapid (Type 901) and in the 1980s for the rear-engine Rapid coupé. Today, the Rapid is used for several small family cars: larger sedan and hatchback from Europe, smaller sedan from India and China.

Overview
In October 2011, Škoda resurrected the Rapid nameplate for its similar version of the Volkswagen Vento made in India, with sales starting in November. The cars are similar, except for the grille, headlights, bumpers, taillights and some interior and exterior trim. The car is produced by Škoda Auto India Private Limited in Pune.

On the inside, the cabin is similar to its Volkswagen counterpart, apart from the Škoda family steering wheel, instrument panel, gear-lever and audio system. The central console has vents, buttons and climate control adapted from VW; the audio system, with its large buttons and fonts, is designed by Škoda. The Rapid includes features such as an information centre, driver assist, audio system with audio input for portable media players and SD/MMC data card reader, adjustable seats, headrests, armrests, tilt steering.

The 2017 Skoda Rapid facelift comes with revised styling that makes it look sharper. New exterior changes include new front grille, headlamps, chrome door handles, smoked out tail lamps, etc. Some of the new features include cruise control, rain sensing wipers, reach and rake adjustable steering, cooled glovebox and footwell lighting. According to MotorBeam 0–100 km/hr sprint for the diesel DSG is claimed to be 10.7 seconds with 190.8 km/hr top speed and with manual 10.3 seconds with a top speed of 200 km/hr.

Selected acknowledgements
 2011: In December 2011, it was voted Family Car of the Year by the Indian edition Top Gear magazine.

Related models
The European model of the ŠKODA Rapid is based on the Škoda MissionL concept car, and was launched in 2012. It is, however, a different design, slightly longer, with different interiors, a slightly different body shape, and different engine options. It was shown in premiere at the Paris Motor Show in September 2012.

Engines
Overview of engines available for the Rapid (India).

Petrol engines

Diesel engines

Facelift

The Rapid received a facelift in early 2017, making it look similar to its other Skoda siblings.
Current Škoda Rapid made since 2017 is the successor to Škoda Rapid (2011). Rapid is a model name that the Czech auto manufacturer has used since the 1930s. The Škoda Rapid is now available in hatchback and sedan versions. Škoda launched the Rapid sedan in India in the year 2011. The Škoda Rapid sedan is essentially based on the Skoda Fabia hatchback vehicle. The Rapid is a popular premium sedan in the car market of India. The Czech auto major launched the new updated Škoda Rapid sedan in the Indian car market in November 2016. The new Škoda Rapid facelift model comes with an array of changes and updates to help it enhance its appeal to the customers and to increase the sales volumes.

Exterior 
The updated Škoda Rapid has been endowed with a new front fascia that is in line with Skoda's new design language. The new Rapid facelift's redesigned front end comes with a newly styled radiator grille that is surrounded by a chrome finished frame and new angular headlight design to appear sharper than before and to enhance the aggressive visual appeal. The sedan model also gets a new bumper design that is sharper than before and houses a large honeycomb air intake that further enhances the sharper and bolder appeal, while fog lamps are placed on either side of the air intake. The new updated Rapid also comes endowed with some mild updates on its rear design. The updates on the car's back design include a restyled bumper and a new chrome strip on the car's boot lid. Skoda has also endowed a new boot lip spoiler and revised tail lamps to offer a fresher look for the rear façade of the facelift Rapid. The side profile of the sedan remains unchanged, excepting for the redesigned alloy wheels. The range topping variants of the sedan also offers LED daytime running lights which are integrated to the dual barrel headlamp setup of the car.

Interior 
The cabin of the Rapid has also been improved with some upgrades and changes to match its fresher exterior. The sedan also gets some added features such as cruise control system, light sensing automatic headlamps and rain sensing automatic wipers. The top-of-the-line variant of the Rapid sedan offers a 6.5-inch touchscreen integrated infotainment system that comes along with MirrorLink feature that allows one to put all the smartphone content on to the automobile's display. There are also the standard connectivity options such as AUX, USB and Bluetooth. Other features include Automatic Climate Control, Multi-function Steering Wheel and more.

Engine and transmission 
The Skoda Rapid is offered for sale in India in both petrol and diesel versions. The new updated Skoda Rapid's petrol gets powered by the familiar 1.6-liter petrol motor that has the capability to generate a maximum power output of 105 bhp along with 153 Nm of top torque. The petrol engine gets equipped with a 5-speed manual transmission gearbox as well as a 6-speed automatic transmission gearbox.

The Rapid facelift has come equipped with a new diesel engine, which is its primary attraction for the diesel version. The sedan comes powered by a new 1.5 liter 4-cylinder, turbocharged diesel engine that can deliver a peak power output of 109 Bhp along with 250 Nm of top torque. This diesel mill is also paired with a standard 5 speed manual transmission gearbox, while it also offers the choice of a 7 speed DSG transmission gearbox.

Mileage 

The Skoda Rapid petrol offers a fuel efficiency of a maximum 14.3 km per liter on the automatic transmission and 15 km per liter on the manual transmission variants. On the other hand, for the diesel version the company claims a mileage of 21.13 km per liter on the manual transmission variant and 21.72 km per liter on the automatic transmission model.

References

External links

Škoda Rapid official website

Rapid
Cars of India
Sedans
Cars introduced in 2011